Sonnet 120 is one of 154 sonnets written by the English playwright and poet William Shakespeare. It's a member of the Fair Youth sequence, in which the poet expresses his love towards a young man.

Structure 
Sonnet 120 is an English or Shakespearean sonnet. The English sonnet has three quatrains, followed by a final rhyming couplet. It follows the typical rhyme scheme of the form ABAB CDCD EFEF GG and is composed in iambic pentameter, a type of poetic metre based on five pairs of metrically weak/strong syllabic positions. The 4th line exemplifies a regular iambic pentameter:

×  /    ×  /      ×     /   ×   /  ×      / 
Unless my nerves were brass or hammer'd steel. (120.4)

Four lines (5, 7, 9, and 11) have a final extrametrical syllable or feminine ending, as for example:

 ×  /   ×   /    ×  / ×  /   ×     /(×) 
For if you were by my unkindness shaken, (120.5)
/ = ictus, a metrically strong syllabic position. × = nonictus. (×) = extrametrical syllable.

Interpretations
Paul Rhys, for the 2002 compilation album, When Love Speaks (EMI Classics)

Notes

References

British poems
Sonnets by William Shakespeare